The Power and Propulsion Element (PPE), previously known as the Asteroid Redirect Vehicle propulsion system, is a planned solar electric ion propulsion module being developed by Maxar Technologies for NASA. It is one of the major components of the Gateway. The PPE will allow access to the entire lunar surface and a wide range of lunar orbits and double as a space tug for visiting craft. 

The PPE originally started development at the Jet Propulsion Laboratory as a part of the now cancelled Asteroid Redirect Mission, but is now led and managed by the NASA John H. Glenn Research Center, in Cleveland, Ohio. When ARM was cancelled, the solar electric propulsion was repurposed as the PPE for the Gateway. The PPE is designed to be able to transfer the reusable Gateway to lunar orbit. It will also serve as the communications center of the Gateway. The PPE is intended to have a mass of 8–9 tons and the capability to generate 50 kW  of solar electric power using Roll Out Solar Arrays for its Hall-effect thrusters, which can be supplemented by chemical propulsion. It is currently planned to launch on a Falcon Heavy in November 2024 along with the HALO module.

The PPE will be compatible with the International Docking System Standard. This means that any IDSS Spacecraft could theoretically dock to the PPE, such as Orion, the International Space Station, Dragon 2, Dream Chaser, and Boeing Starliner. The other modules of the Lunar Gateway will most likely also be IDSS compatible.

Development

Asteroid Redirect Vehicle bus 

The Asteroid Redirect Vehicle was a robotic, high performance solar electric spacecraft for the Asteroid Redirect Mission (ARM). The mission was to send the spacecraft to a near-Earth asteroid and capture a multi-ton boulder from the surface with a grappling device. It would then transport the asteroid into orbit around the moon where crewed missions to study it could be conducted more easily. The mission was cancelled in early 2017 and the spacecraft's propulsion segment became the Power and Propulsion Element (PPE) for the Deep Space Gateway, now known as the Gateway.

Reusable Space Tug missions 
During the Asteroid Redirect Mission, space tug missions were purposed to separate Mars logistics that can spend a longer time in space than the crew into a separate mission, which could have reduced the costs by as much as 60% (if using advanced solar electric propulsion (ion engines) ). They would also reduce the overall mission risk by enabling check-out of critical systems at Mars before the crew departs Earth. This way if something goes wrong in those logistics, the crew is not in danger and the hardware can simply be fixed or relaunched.

Not only would the solar electric propulsion (SEP) technologies and designs be applied to future missions, but the ARM spacecraft would be left in a stable orbit for reuse. The project had baselined any of multiple refueling capabilities. The asteroid-specific payload was at one end of the spacecraft bus, either for possible removal and replacement via future servicing, or as a separable, reusable spacecraft, leaving a qualified space tug in cislunar space. This made adaption for Gateway easy, as the propulsion system was already designed to be multi-mission reusable. When the ARM was cancelled however, development on the bus and any reusable tug ideas died, temporarily.

Power and Propulsion Element 

In 2017, a year after the Artemis program came into existence, the ARM space tug/propulsion bus was dusted off and repurposed as the main propulsion system for the Gateway space station, and officially became known as the Power and Propulsion Element or PPE. The PPE will be a smaller version of the Asteroid Redirect bus. The Gateway was eventually broken off from Artemis as a separate program to ensure the speedy moon landing by 2024 without having to wait for the Gateway to be completed.

Commercial company studies 
On 1 November 2017, NASA commissioned 5 studies lasting four months into affordable ways to develop the Power and Propulsion Element (PPE), hopefully leveraging private companies' plans. These studies had a combined budget of US$2.4 million. The companies performing the PPE studies were Boeing, Lockheed Martin, Orbital ATK, Sierra Nevada and Space Systems/Loral. These awards are in addition to the ongoing set of NextSTEP-2 awards made in 2016 to study development and make ground prototypes of habitat modules that could be used on the Gateway as well as other commercial applications, so the Gateway is likely to incorporate components developed under NextSTEP as well.

Contract awarded 
In May 2019, Maxar Technologies was contracted by NASA to manufacture this module, which will also supply the station with electrical power and is based on Maxar's SSL 1300 series satellite bus. The PPE will use Busek 6kW Hall-effect thrusters and NASA Advanced Electric Propulsion System (AEPS) Hall-effect thrusters. Maxar was awarded a firm-fixed price contract of US$375 million to build the PPE. Maxar's SSL business unit, previously known as Space Systems/Loral, will lead the project. Maxar stated they will receive help from Blue Origin and Draper Laboratory on the project, with Blue Origin assisting in human-rating and safety aspect while Draper will work with trajectory and navigation development. NASA is supplying the PPE with a S-band communications system to provide a radio link with nearby vehicles and a passive docking adapter to receive the Gateway's future utilization module. Maxar stated they are experienced dealing with high power components from making satellites. They did mention that their satellites are around 20 to 30 kilowatts, while the PPE will be about 60 kilowatts, but they say much of the technology they have already developed will still be applicable. After a one-year demonstration period, NASA would then "exercise a contract option to take over control of the spacecraft". Its expected service time is about 15 years.

See also

 Zarya (Functional Cargo Block; FGB/ФГБ), the International Space Station power, propulsion, control, and storage, module

References 

Lunar Gateway
2024 in spaceflight
Artemis program
Crewed spacecraft
Joint ventures
Missions to the Moon
NASA programs
NASA space stations
Spacecraft using halo orbits
Proposed space stations